Poroporo is a rural community in the Whakatāne District and Bay of Plenty Region of New Zealand's North Island. It is located south-west of Whakatāne, inland from the settlement.

According to Te Whare Wānanga o Awanuiārangi, the Māori language is the "primary language of social engagement" in Poroporo.

Poroporo has its own rugby and sports club, which plays home games on a dedicated rugby field.

History and culture

History

Ngāti Awa elder, soldier and community leader Peter Mason was born in the area in 1943. He was brought up in a simple, dirt-floor home on a small pā. His family worked for local farmers, grew their own crops and fished in the nearby river before it was dammed to irrigate new farms. Mason speak exclusively Māori, until beginning at the local Poroporo Native School.

A man died in a house fire in Poroporo in September 2018.

Marae

Poroporo is in the rohe (tribal area) of Ngāti Awa. It has several marae, which are meeting grounds of Ngāti Awa hapū:

 Pūkeko Marae and Pūkeko meeting house is affiliated with Ngāti Pūkeko.
 Rangataua Marae and Rangataua meeting house is affiliated with Ngāti Rangataua.
 Rangimarie Marae and Rarawhati meeting house is affiliated with Te Whānau o Tariao Tapuke.
 Rewatu Marae and Ueimua meeting house is affiliated with Ngāi Tamapare.

In October 2020, the Government committed $4,871,246 from the Provincial Growth Fund to upgrade Pūkeko, Rangataua, Rewatu and 9 other Ngāti Awa marae, creating 23 jobs.

References

Whakatane District
Populated places in the Bay of Plenty Region